Coccyzus is a genus of  cuckoos which occur in the Americas. The genus name is from Ancient Greek kokkuzo, which means to call like a common cuckoo. The genus includes the lizard cuckoos that were formerly included in the genus Saurothera.

Taxonomy
The genus Coccyzus was introduced in 1816 by the French ornithologist Louis Jean Pierre Vieillot to accommodate a single species, Comte de Buffon's "Coucou de la Caroline", now the yellow-billed cuckoo. This which is therefore the type species. The genus name is from the Ancient Greek kokkuzō meaning "to cry cuckoo".

The results of a molecular phylogenetic study of the cuckoo family by Michael Sorenson and Robert Payne that was published in 2005 lead to a reorganization of some of the genera. Based on this study, the genera Saurothera (the lizard cuckoos) and Hyetornis (chestnut-bellied and bay-breasted cuckoos) were lumped with Coccyzus while the ash-colored cuckoo and dwarf cuckoo, at one time separated in Micrococcyx, were found to be closest relatives of the little cuckoo, formerly in Piaya. These three species were placed in the resurrected genus Coccycua.

Species
The genus contains 13 species:

Description and ecology
These birds are of variable size with slender bodies, long tails and strong legs. Many have black and white undertail patterns. They occur in a variety of forests, woodlands or mangroves.
 
Coccyzus cuckoos, unlike many Old World species, build their own nests in trees and lay two or more eggs. Yellow-billed and black-billed cuckoos occasionally lay eggs in the nests of other birds, but are not obligate brood parasites like the common cuckoo of Eurasia.

Northern species such as yellow-billed and black-billed cuckoos are strong migrants, wintering in Central or South America, and occasionally wander to western Europe as rare vagrants, but the tropical  Coccyzus cuckoos are mainly sedentary.

These are vocal species when breeding, with persistent and loud calls. They feed on large insects such as cicadas, wasps and caterpillars (including those with stinging hairs or spines which are distasteful to many birds). Lizard cuckoos are large and powerful species, and mainly take vertebrate prey, especially, as the name implies, lizards.

References

 
Bird genera

Taxa named by Louis Jean Pierre Vieillot